Rowan Schlosberg is a British actor, best known for his television work in the UK, USA and Australia.

Career
Schlosberg graduated from Australia's National Institute of Dramatic Art (NIDA) with a degree in Performing Arts (Acting). After beginning his career in Australia he went on to perform in television productions in both the UK, Australia and North America, including Smallpox, E=MC2, headLand, East West 101 and Obsession: Dark Desires. He was also cast in the stage productions of Tim Firth's premier Absolutely Frank at the Queen's Theatre in Hornchurch and the West End production of Miracle. In 2014, he took on the role of Theo in the Canadian/UK television production of Olympus, as well as joining the cast in Bravo's sitcom Girlfriends' Guide to Divorce. By the start of 2015 he was cast in a guest role on Supernatural for the CW Network and in 2016 joined the cast of "The Arrangement" for E! Entertainment in a recurring role as Nate Dancourt. In 2017, he shot 4 episodes as "Connor" for the Netflix series of Lost in Space, as well as 2 episodes in Ghost Wars for the Syfy network as Dr. Nate Fisher. In October 2017 he was cast as Vivek for 2 episodes of ABC's new drama The Crossing''. He went on to play William Shakespeare in DC Legends of Tomorrow before reprising his role of Connor in Lost in Space and joining the cast of NBC's Debris.

Filmography

References

External links

Living people
Year of birth missing (living people)